Boothby, Lincolnshire may refer to:
Boothby Graffoe, Lincolnshire, England
Boothby Pagnell, Lincolnshire, England